The 2019 Elon Phoenix football team represented Elon University in the 2019 NCAA Division I FCS football season. They were led by first-year head coach Tony Trisciani and played their home games at Rhodes Stadium. They were members of the Colonial Athletic Association (CAA). They finished the season 5–6, 4–4 in CAA play to finish in a four-way tie for fifth place.

Previous season
The Phoenix finished the 2018 season 6–5, 4–3 in CAA play to finish in sixth place. They received an at-large bid to the FCS Playoffs where they were lost to Wofford in the first round.

On December 14, head coach Curt Cignetti resigned to become the head coach at James Madison. He finished at Elon with a two-year record of 14–9.

Preseason

CAA poll
In the CAA preseason poll released on July 23, 2019, the Phoenix were predicted to finish in fourth place.

Preseason All–CAA team
The Phoenix had two players selected to the preseason all-CAA team.

Offense

Jaylan Thomas – RB

Matt Foster – TE

Schedule

Game summaries

at North Carolina A&T

The Citadel

at Richmond

at Wake Forest

James Madison

at New Hampshire

Delaware

at Rhode Island

William & Mary

Maine

at Towson

Ranking movements

References

Elon
Elon Phoenix football seasons
Elon Phoenix football